Huang Xiaoming or Mark Huang (born 13 November 1977) is a Chinese actor, singer, and model. He graduated from the Performance Institute of the Beijing Film Academy in 2000. Huang first rose to prominence in 2001 for playing Emperor Wu of Han in the television series The Prince of Han Dynasty. In 2007, Huang signed a contract with Huayi Brothers and began focusing on his film career, appearing in films like The Sniper (2009), The Message (2010), and Sacrifice (2010).

Huang is best known for his roles in television as Yang Guo in The Return of the Condor Heroes (2006), Xu Wenqiang in Shanghai Bund (2007), Luo Xi in  Summer's Desire (2010), Yue Fei in The Patriot Yue Fei (2013) and Zuo Zhen in Cruel Romance (2015); as well as his roles in films American Dreams in China (2013) and Xuanzang (2016).

Early life and education
Huang was born in Qingdao, Shandong and is an only child. His father was an engineer while his mother was an accountant. At age nine, he was selected by a film studio to play the child protagonist in a movie. Throughout his school life, Huang planned to become a scientist, but his language teacher encouraged him to apply to the Beijing Film Academy, which infrequently came to Qingdao to recruit students. A week before his entrance examination, his foot was run over and crushed by a jeep; the injury was not serious because he was wearing army boots. While studying at the Beijing Film Academy, Huang recalls the person who had the greatest influence on him, a teacher named Cui Xinqin. He was close friends and classmates with Zhao Wei and Chen Kun; the trio was known as the "Three Musketeers".

Career

1998–2007: Beginnings and success in television
In 1984, Huang was initially chosen by a producer to star in a drama as a child actor, but was dropped later because of his shy and introverted
personality. In 1996, Huang auditioned for Beijing Film Academy and joined in the same year. He later debuted in the 1998 drama Love is Not a Game.

Huang began to gain attention when he was chosen to replace Lu Yi for the leading role in The Prince of Han Dynasty, which earned high ratings. He later starred in all three installments of the series from 2001 to 2005, and went from an unknown newbie to a front-line actor. He also played Tang Bohu in the drama Merry Wanderer Tang Bohu (2003), for which he won the Outstanding Actor award at the 14th
Zhejiang TV Peony Award for his performance; and Xiao Jian in My Fair Princess III (2003).

Huang's most controversial and difficult, but most critically acclaimed role was in Shanghai Bund (2007), a remake of the 1980 Hong Kong television series The Bund, which starred Chow Yun-fat. Because Chow was his idol, he felt nervous, excited, and pressured about portraying the same role his idol had.

In 2008, Huang portrayed the iconic Wei Xiaobao in Royal Tramp, adopted from Louis Cha's wuxia novel The Deer and the Cauldron.

2009–2012: Venturing into films

After achieving success in television, Huang decided to focus his career on the big screen. His first major role was in the historical film The Banquet as the antagonist.

He also starred in the Hong Kong action film The Sniper (2009), martial arts film  Ip Man 2 (2010) and the historical epic Sacrifice (2010) directed by Chen Kaige.

Huang made a comeback to television with Taiwanese idol drama Summer's Desire (2011), based on the novel of the same name by Ming Xiaoxi. Although originally slated to play Ou Chen, Huang asked if he could play Luo Xi instead. Huang later admitted that he lowered his acting fee to participate in this series.

His performance as a bandit leader who can't see further than making money from plunder and kidnapping won him the Best Actor award at the 4th China Image Film Festival. Huang also starred in martial arts epic The Guillotines and played the younger version of Chow Yun-fat's character in The Last Tycoon.

The same year, Huang was selected as the ambassador of the Changchun Film Festival. He also became the first mainland actor to have his wax figure displayed in Hong Kong's Madam Tussauds museum.

2013–present: Critical acclaim and leading roles
Huang starred in the film American Dreams in China (2013) by Peter Chan. The success of the film brought a new impetus into Huang's career, and won him the Best Actor award at the 29th Golden Rooster Awards, 15th Huabiao Awards, 12th Changchun Film Festival and 32nd Hundred Flowers Awards. The same year Huang starred in another television project, playing the titular hero in the historical drama The Patriot Yue Fei.

Huang next starred in John Woo's The Crossing (2014). Set in 1930s Shanghai, the romantic epic is based on the true story of the Taiping steamer collision and follows six characters and their intertwining love stories; Huang plays a successful general who romances a wealthy debutante (played by Korean actress Song Hye-kyo). Another romance film followed; where Huang starred next to Fan Bingbing in The White Haired Witch of Lunar Kingdom, adapted from Baifa Monü Zhuan.

Huang returned to TV in the period romance drama, Cruel Romance (2015), starring alongside actress Joe Chen. The series was commercially successful, and recorded high ratings. The same year, Huang starred alongside long-time friend Zhao Wei in the action comedy film Hollywood Adventures.

In 2017, Huang starred in the historical wuxia drama Nirvana in Fire 2. The series was critically acclaimed for its storyline and performance, including Huang who won positive reviews for his acting.

In 2018, Huang starred in the drama film Forever Young, which tells stories of four generations of students from Tsinghua University. Huang received good reviews for his performance as a bashful boy who suffered from the cultural revolution, and once again affirmed his reputation on the big screen.

In 2019, Huang starred in the disaster film The Bravest as a fire fighter. In 2020, Huang starred in the period romance drama Winter Begonia produced by Yu Zheng.

Other activities

Endorsements
In 2011, Huang was named Global Ambassador for Tissot.

Investment
Huang is a shareholder of Huayi Brothers Media Corporation, with about 1.8 million shares.

Philanthropy
In 2009, Huang donated one million yuan to adopt two panda cubs and was named an ambassador to China's Panda Protection Research Center.

In 2010, Huang donated 200,000 yuan for earthquake relief to support for victims of the Yushu temblor in Northwest China's Qinghai province.

In 2016, Huang was named a UNAIDS National Goodwill Ambassador for China. The same year, he was appointed as an advocate for anti-trafficking by the Ministry of Public Security.

Personal life
On 28 February 2014, Huang announced his relationship with Angelababy. They registered their marriage with Qingdao Civil Affairs Authority on 27 May 2015 and on October of the same year, they had their wedding at Shanghai Exhibition Centre. On their 1st anniversary, Huang announced Angelababy's pregnancy on Weibo. Their son was born on 17 January 2017 in Hong Kong.

Huang Xiaoming's younger second cousin Chen Meng is the world's No.1 ranked female table tennis player. Their paternal grandmothers are sisters.

On January 28, 2022, Huang and Angelababy announced their divorce.

Filmography

Film

Television series

Variety show

Discography

Albums

Singles

Awards and nominations

Film and television

Music

Others

Forbes China Celebrity 100

References

External links 
 

1977 births
Living people
20th-century Chinese male actors
21st-century Chinese male actors
21st-century Chinese male singers
Beijing Film Academy alumni
Chinese male film actors
Chinese male models
Chinese male television actors
Chinese Mandopop singers
Male actors from Qingdao
Musicians from Qingdao
Singers from Shandong